Eucleidas reigned Sparta from 227 BC to 222 BC. He was an Agiad, son of Leonidas II, in the place of the Eurypontid king. 

His brother, Cleomenes III, deposed his Eurypontid colleague Archidamus V, and installed his brother as his new co-ruler. 

According to Pausanias, Cleomenes poisoned Eudamidas III, his Eurypontid colleague, and shared the royal power with his brother Eucleidas.

Eucleidas was killed fighting against the Macedonians at the Battle of Sellasia (222 BC).

References

Footnotes

3rd-century BC rulers
3rd-century BC Spartans
Agiad kings of Sparta
Eurypontid kings of Sparta
3rd-century BC births
222 BC deaths
Ancient Greeks killed in battle
Monarchs killed in action